Eiffel 65 is an Italian Eurodance group that was formed in 1997 in the studios of the Turin record company Bliss Corporation, consisting of Jeffrey Jey, Maurizio Lobina and Gabry Ponte. They gained global popularity with their singles "Blue (Da Ba Dee)" and "Move Your Body" from their 1999 debut studio album Europop. The singles reached number one in many countries, while the album peaked at number four on the Billboard 200 chart. Their following two albums, Contact! (2001) and their 2003 self-titled album did not gain international success, but still managed to gain success in Italy.

Over the course of their career, the group won a World Music Award in 2000 for the World Best Selling Italian Group, and a B.M.I USA in Los Angeles, rewarding the most-broadcast song on radio in the United States. They were also nominated at the Grammy Award for Best Dance Recording for "Blue (Da Ba Dee)". Europop was crowned as the greatest album of the 1990s by Channel 4.

Eiffel 65 also produced remixes of numerous popular songs, and they recorded "One Goal", one of the official songs of the UEFA Euro 2000, and "Living in My City" for the 2006 Winter Olympics. With more than 20 million copies sold and many gold, platinum and diamond records, Eiffel 65 is one of Italy's most popular electronic groups.

In 2005, Ponte focused on his solo career, and then Jey and Lobina collaborated as a duo called Bloom 06. In 2010, the original group reunited; although Ponte does not participate in record production and concerts.

History

Formation
Randone, Ponte and Lobina met at Bliss Corporation, which was founded in 1992 by Massimo Gabutti. A computer chose the name Eiffel randomly from a group of words the three had selected but the number 65 was added to it by mistake: the producer had written a phone number on a piece of paper and two digits of it ended up on the label copy. The graphic artist who received it assumed that it had been added afterwards so he just fused it to the band name for their first release.

1997–2005
Eiffel 65 became famous for their international chart-topping hits "Blue (Da Ba Dee)" and "Move Your Body". Both songs were featured singles on their debut album Europop, which was released on November 22, 1999.

The band achieved considerable success in Italy and the rest of Europe, in the United States, Canada, Australia, New Zealand, and Brazil. Europop peaked in the top five on the Billboard 200 and on the Billboard Canadian Albums chart. "Blue (Da Ba Dee)" peaked at number 6 on the Billboard Hot 100, reached No. 1 in the UK and in Germany and number 3 in Italy. Their second album, Contact! was released in 2001, with "'80s Stars" peaking at No. 9 in Italy. A self-titled album was released in 2003.

Eiffel 65 also remixed, between 1999 and 2002, other artists' tracks like the Bloodhound Gang's "The Bad Touch", Nek's "La vita è", S Club 7's "Reach" and in early 2005, a remix of Yo Yo Mundi's "L'ultimo testimone".

Bloom 06

In early March 2005, the group's DJ, Gabry Ponte, went on to focus on his solo career. On 16 May 2005, the other two members, Maurizio Lobina and Jeffrey Jey, decided to leave Bliss Corporation to continue with their own production company. Since the name "Eiffel 65" was a property of Bliss Corporation, the duo decided to continue under a new name, as announced in June 2005, Bloom 06.

Eiffel 65's long anticipated fourth album, under the working title Crash Test, had already finished production by the time of Maury and Jeffrey's departure from Bliss Corporation. It was renamed Crash Test 01 and was released by Bloom 06 on 13 October 2006. The album contains lyrics in English and Italian.

Reunion

Bliss Corporation confirmed that a new Eiffel 65 lineup would make their debut in the summer of 2007 but the debut was postponed. In 2009, Bliss Corporation began to promote work from older bands by subtitling music videos and releasing "unseen" video footage from Eiffel 65. In June 2010, it was announced on the Bloom 06 website that Eiffel 65 would reunite once again to produce new music as well as touring.  In an April 2012 interview, Jeffrey Jey commented on the progress of the new album:
 

In the meantime they toured Europe with their New Planet Tour, a multimedia show with wide screens and in the summer of 2012, they announced a mini tour in Australia on their site.

On 2 April 2016, a demo of Eiffel 65's new single "Panico" was posted on Bliss Corporation's YouTube channel. "Panico" and its English version "Critical" were officially released on iTunes on 1 June 2016. However, their fourth album release date is still unknown.

In late February 2023, the group appeared on the list of artists who will compete in Una Voce Per San Marino, a song contest where the winning song will represent San Marino at the Eurovision Song Contest 2023 in Liverpool.

Zorotl
Zorotlekuykauo Sushik IV "Zorotl" is a character created by the Bliss Corporation and featured in the videos of "Blue (Da Ba Dee)", "Move Your Body" and "Lucky (In My Life)". Zorotl was supposed to be a malicious character but since he was designed with a funny round body, the authors of the "Blue (Da Ba Dee)" video decided to portray it as tender, changing the script and giving it a happy ending. In 2000, Bliss Corporation made a video for the unreleased Eiffel 65 song "I Wanna Be". An alpha version of the video appeared as enhanced content for Eiffel 65's single "Too Much of Heaven". The song is credited to Zorotl even though it was recorded by members of Eiffel 65, so Zorotl is considered a virtual group.

Members
Jeffrey Jey (real name Gianfranco Randone), born 5 January 1970 in Lentini, Sicily – vocals, producer (1997-2005, 2010–present)
Maury Lobina (previously known as Apollo, real name Maurizio Lobina), born 30 October 1973 in Asti, Piedmont – producer, keyboards, keytar, piano (1997-2005, 2010–present)
Gabry Ponte (real name Gabriele Ponte), born 20 April 1973 in Turin, Piedmont – DJ, producer (1997-2005, 2010–present)

Discography

 Europop (1999)
 Contact! (2001)
 Eiffel 65 (2003)

Awards and nominations
{| class="wikitable sortable plainrowheaders" 
|-
! scope="col" | Award
! scope="col" | Year
! scope="col" | Category
! scope="col" | Nominee(s)
! scope="col" | Result
! scope="col" class="unsortable"| 
|-
! scope="row"|BMI Pop Awards
| 2001
| Award-Winning Song
| "Blue (Da Ba Dee)"
| 
|
|-
! scope="row"|Grammy Awards
| 2001
| Best Dance Recording
| "Blue (Da Ba Dee)"
| 
|
|-
! scope="row"|World Music Awards
| 2000
| World's Best Selling Italian Group
| Themselves
| 
|
|-
! scope="row"|Hungarian Music Awards
| 2000
| Best Foreign Dance Album
| Europop
| 
|
|-
! scope="row"|International Dance Music Awards
| 2000
| Best HiNRJ 12' 
| "Blue (Da Ba Dee)"
| 
|
|-
! scope="row"|RSH Gold Awards
| 2000
| Best Dance Act
| Themselves
| 
|
|-
! scope="row"|Smash Hits Poll Winners Party
| 1999
| Best Dance Choon
| "Blue (Da Ba Dee)"
| 
|
|-
! scope="row"|The Record of the Year
| 1999
| Record of the Year
| "Blue (Da Ba Dee)"
| 
|

References

External links

 
1997 establishments in Italy
Musical groups established in 1997
Musical groups disestablished in 2005
Musical groups reestablished in 2010
Italian Eurodance groups
Italian musical trios
Europop groups
Musicians from Turin
Warner Records artists
Republic Records artists
Universal Music Group artists